King Tubbys Meets Rockers Uptown is a dub studio album by Augustus Pablo and King Tubby, released in 1976.  It features Carlton Barrett on drums, Robbie Shakespeare and Aston Barrett on bass guitar, and Earl "Chinna" Smith on guitar.  Pablo produced the album and played melodica, piano, organ and clavinet.  The album was recorded at Randy's in Kingston, Jamaica.  A distinctly different mix of the title song with vocals and dub, titled "Baby I Love You So", can be found on the Jacob Miller and Augustus Pablo 1975 album, Who Say Jah No Dread.

The album has been released on several different labels, often with slightly different artworks and track lists.

The title song was released as a 45 rpm single in 1974 on the Mango label (MS-2001), with "Baby I Love You So" as the B-side.

The album was listed in the 1999 book The Rough Guide: Reggae: 100 Essential CDs.

Track listing 
Track listing taken from Clocktower Records LP CT0085
All tracks composed by Augustus Pablo

Side one
 "Keep On Dubbing"
 "Stop Them Jah"
 "Young Generation Dub"
 "Each One Dub"
 "555 Dub Street"

Side two
 "Braces Tower Dub"
 "King Tubby Meets Rockers Uptown"
 "Corner Crew Dub"
 "Say So"
 "Skanking Dub"
 "Frozen Dub"
 "Satta Dub" (Unlisted)

2003 Deluxe edition bonus tracks
 "Black Gunn" 
 "1 Ruthland Close" 
 "1-2-3 Version" 
 "Silent Satta"

Personnel 
Augustus Pablo – melodica, piano, clavinet, organ, producer
Robbie Shakespeare – bass guitar
Aston "Family Man" Barrett – bass guitar
Carlton "Carlie" Barrett – drums
Earl "Chinna" Smith – guitar
Richard "Dirty Harry" Hall – tenor saxophone
Bobby Ellis – trumpet
Vincent "Don D Junior" Gordon – trombone
Technical
King Tubby and Errol Thompson - mixing engineer
Glen Osborne - executive producer, design
Michael Scudder - photography

References

External links 

Roots Archives

Augustus Pablo albums
1976 albums
Dub albums